The UK National Quantum Technologies Programme (UKNQTP) is a programme set up by the UK government  to translate academic work on quantum mechanics, and the effects of quantum superposition and quantum entanglement into new products and services. It brings UK physicists and engineers together with companies and entrepreneurs who have an interest in commercialising the technology.

The "second quantum revolution"
The "second quantum revolution", or "quantum 2.0" is a term that is often used to describe quantum technologies based on superposition and entanglement. Originally described in a 1997 book by Gerard J. Milburn, which was then followed by a 2003 article by Jonathan P. Dowling and Gerard J. Milburn, as well as a 2003 article by David Deutsch. These technologies use equipment such as highly stabilised laser systems, magneto-optical traps, cryogenic cooled solid state devices, ion traps and vacuum systems to create, manipulate and then use quantum effects for a number of different purposes. These include: quantum information processing, such as quantum computing, quantum simulation, quantum secure communications, quantum sensing and metrology and quantum imaging, and are widely believed to offer capabilities that will out-perform existing and future classical technologies.

Vision 
The vision of the UK National Quantum Technologies programme is to "create a coherent government, industry and academic quantum technology community that gives the UK a world-leading position in the emerging multi-billion-pound new quantum technology markets, and to substantially enhance the value of some of the biggest UK-based industries."

History
The UKNQTP was initiated by a £270 million investment by the UK Chancellor of the exchequer, George Osborne in the Autumn Statement 2013. In addition to this, the UK Defence Science and Technology Laboratory (Dstl) separately announced a £30 million investment into a programme to produce demonstrator devices.

Organisation and governance
The primary focus of the UKNQTP are four 'hubs' for quantum technologies:
Quantum Hub for sensors and metrology, led by the University of Birmingham
Quantum Communications Hub, led by the University of York
NQIT: Quantum hub for Networked Quantum Information Technologies, led by the University of Oxford
QuantIC: Quantum hub for quantum enhanced imaging, with a central team at the University of Glasgow

The UKQTP is advised by the Quantum Technologies Strategic Advisory Board, which is chaired by Professor David Delpy, it also consists of Professor Sir Peter Knight, Baroness Neville-Jones, Professor Gerald Milburn,  Professor Ian Walmsley and other leading individuals from industry, academia and public sector.

The programme is delivered by several UK public bodies: UK government Department for Business, Innovation and Skills (BIS), EPSRC, Innovate UK, Dstl, NPL, CESG and the Knowledge Transfer Network.

Press coverage
The UKQTP has received some attention from the UK media, with an interview with Professor Miles Padgett  on the BBC Radio 4 Today programme on 11 November 2015 and articles in New Scientist, and Nature materials

Key milestones and achievements

 Summer 2013 - Dstl, after consultation with the academic community publish a UK Quantum Technologies Landscape document, which outlines a number of areas of research that are ready to become devices for defence and commercial use.
 Autumn 2013 - The UK Chancellor George Osborne announces a £270 million investment into quantum technologies
 November 2014 - The Science Minister at the time, Greg Clark announces a "national network of quantum technology hubs" 
 March 2015 - The Quantum Technologies Strategic Advisory Board release their strategy for the UKNQTP
 April 2015 - Innovate UK announces the results the competition 'exploring the commercial applications of quantum technologies', a £5 million funding round for companies working to develop quantum technologies.

References

College and university associations and consortia in the United Kingdom
Programmes of the Government of the United Kingdom
Emerging technologies
Engineering and Physical Sciences Research Council
Quantum information science
Quantum computing